Nadakkal is a small village, 2 km from  Kalluvathukkal in Kollam, Kerala, India. It is near National Highway 47.

References

Villages in Kollam district